Argila is a 1940 Brazilian romantic drama film directed by Humberto Mauro and starring Carmen Santos, Celso Guimarães, and Lídia Mattos.

Cast
Carmen Santos as Luciana
Celso Guimarães as Gilberto
Lídia Mattos as Marina
Floriano Faissal as Barrocas
Saint Clair Lopes as Claudio
Bandeira Duarte 
Mauro de Oliveira 
J. Silveira 		
Pérola Negra	
Roberto Rocha	
Anita Otero as Dancer
Chaby Pinheir 		
Geny França	
Bandeira de Mello 		
Eduardo Viana

References

External links
 

1940 films
1940 romantic drama films
Brazilian romantic drama films
Films directed by Humberto Mauro
Brazilian black-and-white films
1940s Portuguese-language films